Fred Kudjo Kuwornu (born 6 September 1971), is an Italian-Ghanaian  filmmaker, producer, civil rights activist and educator who holds both Italian and American citizenship, based in New York.

He is best known as the director of critically acclaimed documentaries such as Blaxploitalian 100 Years of Blackness in Italian Cinema, Inside Buffalo and 18 IUS SOLI. His documentaries deal with political and social themes, such as racism, interracial relations, diversity, Afro-Italians and Black diasporic identity in Italy and the African diaspora in the world. He is the first Italian of African descent to become director.

Personal life
He was born on 6 September 1971 in Bologna, Italy to a Ghanaian father and an Italian mother. His father Perviss Kuwornu is from a village in Volta Region, Ghana, who arrived Italy in 1965 to study medicine. His father specialized in cardiac surgery and general medicine and later graduated from university. His mother Alessandra Giacomelli is an Italian Sephardic Jew from Bologna. Kuwornu grew up in Bologna, then moved to Ghana, Ferrara, Rome.

Career
After high school in Italy and USA, he obtained a degree in political science and mass media, from the University of Bologna. At 16, Fred Kuwornu begins his experience as speaker for Radio Estense, a local radio in Ferrara, hence refining his creative skills along with his passion for music, during the years of the success of Rap and House in Italian culture. His career as DJ will continue for the next 15 years for various radios, such as the historical “Radio Bologna International,” and “Radio Jam FM.” Under the pseudonym “Freddy Goes To House” he works as producer for the label Mantra Vibes, realizing the dance single tracks “The Whistle” (1998) and “Sun Train” (1999). He will then interrupt his radio career when he will move to Rome to work in cinema and TV.

Fred Kuwornu moved to Rome and conducted the TV program Zengi telecast on La7 in 2001 to 2002. He also became an actor with the television serial Un papà quasi perfetto directed by Maurizio dell’Orso. He also worked as television writer for RAI for a TV travel show called Italia Che vai .

In 2003, he directs his short film, Natale in Autogrill. The film became a finalist at the Festival dei Due Mondi of Spoleto as well. In 2008, he quit from television to pursue a career in filmmaking. In 2008, he started film career as a production assistant on the set of the film Miracle at St. Anna directed by Spike Lee. It is based on the Nazi massacre in St. Anna di Stazzema, Italy. After that experience, he made his own documentary, "Inside Buffalo" in 2010 about the African-American soldiers who helped liberate Italy from the Nazis. The documentary includes interviews with African-American Veterans and  Laz Alonso, Omar Benson Miller, Derek Luke and writer James McBride. The film received critical acclaim and later won the award for Best Documentary at the Black International Cinema Berlin festival. Meanwhile, the film was highly praised by former presidents Bill Clinton, Barack Obama and Giorgio Napolitano.

In 2011, during a ceremony at the Houston Museum of Fine Arts, Congresswoman Sheila Jackson Lee, honored Fred Kuwornu with a certificate from the U.S Congress in recognition of the work done to preserve the memory and the contributions of African-American soldiers during WW2.

Other prizes were granted from the US Department of Veteran Affairs, the Governor of Oklahoma Brad Henry, Frank Jackson the mayor of Cleveland and Michael Nutter mayor of Philadelphia, and United States senator Raphael Warnock that organized a special screening of Inside Buffalo at the historical church of Dr. Martin Luther King Jr., Ebenezer Church in Atlanta in 2019.

Inside Buffalo was also presented, among others, at the Pan African Film Festival in Los Angeles, Texas Black Film Festival in Dallas, African Diaspora Film Festival in New York, Atlanta Black DocuFest, Mid-Atlantic Black Film Festival, Black Harvest Chicago Film and Series, Sidewalk Moving Pictures Film Festival.

In 2011, Fred Kuwornu becomes a civil right activist for the so-called "Second Generation Italians," children of immigrants born in Italy but who, because of the Italian Ius Sanguinis, are not allowed to become citizens. The film deals with multiculturalism in Italy and the immigrants born and raised in Italy but are not yet Italian citizens. The film later become one of the first documentaries for social change produced and distributed in Italy which later won the 2012 Ilaria Alpi prize. With the help of an independent and self-created platform, between 2012 and 2106 18 Ius Soli was shown in Italy more than 800 times, at events hosted by cultural associations, schools, universities, and towns, hence fostering the debate on citizenship for children of immigrants, which also involved Roberto Saviano (who praised 18 Ius Soli as a unique testimony). It was also shown abroad, especially in the US, inserting itself in the heated discussions about Dreamers and Immigration.

In 2013, Fred Kuwornu moves himself and his production company, Do the Right Films, to Brooklyn. Here, in 2016, he produces Blaxploitalian, another documentary for social change this time focused on media representation. In this work, Fred uncovers the hidden story of African, African-American and Caribbean actors in Italian cinema. It starts with the 1915 silent film Salambò, continues with Neorealism and the 1970s cinema, to reach the contemporary age. Also inspired by his own experiences as a cinema viewer, Fred's intention with this work is to give voice to actors who had historically been reduced to silence and to stereotypes (according to which ethnic actors are only given roles as illegal immigrant, drug dealer, prostitute, cleaning lady, etc). Among the interviews, there are former Miss Italia Denny Mendez, the Dominican female actor Iris Peynado, and the African-American Harold Bradley and Fred Williamson, an icon of "Blaxploitation."

The documentary became part of the campaign #DiversityMediaMatters, initiated by Fred and aimed at promoting diversity in the global film and TV industries, which Idris Elba, Will Smith and Spike Lee raised addressed the following year. Commenting on Blaxploitalian, Sheril D. Antonio, Dean of the NYU Tisch School of the Arts said: "“Blaxploitalian is such an important work. It continues the conversation about Blacks in the west. It joins forces with W.E.B. DuBois (Double Consciousness); Paul Gilroy (Black Atlantic); Stuart Hall and many other scholars and filmmaker who speak about “Black being both inside and outside the West.”

In 2016, Cheryl Boone Isaacs, president of the Academy Awards, invites Fred Kuwornu and the actor-activist Danny Glover to host an event on diversity in the film industry. That same year, at the Festa del Cinema di Roma, Fred launches the initiative "United Artists for Italy," which supports Black Italian actors and their struggle for more visibility. Between 2016 and 2017, Fred attends various international events on the film industry, such as in Brasil, al Encontro de Cinema Negro Zózimo Bulbul, in Ghana at The National Film and Television Institute, in Spain at the festival Cine Africano, as well as in South Africa, Tanzania, Netherlands, U.K., France, hence becoming an internationally renowned figure on diversity and inclusion. Blaxploitalian was presented at the following film festivals: San Francisco Black Film Festival, Pan African Film Festival Los Angeles, Festa del Cinema di Roma, Baltimore International Film Festival, Eko International Film Festival Lagos, Atlanta Docufest, Martinique Film Festival, Canada World International Film Festival, Martha’s Vineyard Film Festival, New Voices in Black Cinema BAM, Zanzibar International Film Festival.

Also in 2016-17, Fred Kuwornu discovered the young author Antonio Dikele Distefano (who will later become writer and producer of the Netflix series Zero). Fred helps him promoting his first book Fuori Piove Dentro Pure Passo a Prenderti. (2015).

With the concept multimedia project series Blaq•It 'The Black Italians Timeline' started in 2020, Fred Kuwornu experiments the hybridization of documentary with the esthetic storytelling of social media. The series appears on various platforms, such as Facebook, Instagram, Youtube and others.  The series details the historical presence of African descent in Italy, hence presenting not only the recent history of refugees and migrants of the 1990s, but also the broad and incredibly rich universe of Italians of African descent who have been influencing Italian mass culture (through music, social media, Tv, sport, arts, publications, activism).

It became a trend and as part of the new philosophy "Blaq Stars," dedicated to celebrate the Black Diaspora in the world. In September 2020 Netflix chose Fred Kuwornu to do the Italian voiceover for Karamo Brown in the episode "I am perfectly designed" of series Bookmarks- Celebrating Black Voices.

In 2021 Kuwornu produced the documentary of Laila Petrone Mothers & Daughters: Stories of women from Latin America in Italy.

Public Speaking 
Since 2014, Fred Kuwornu has given about 250 lectures and presentations on Diversity in Contemporary Italian Culture and on Black Diaspora at numerous international universities, among which Oxford University, Yale, NYU, Columbia University, University of California, Berkeley University, University of Chicago, Princeton University, Brown University, Cornell University, Stanford University, and many more.   He was an invited guest speaker at conferences, such as:  Black Portraiture[s] II: Imaging the Black Body and Re-staging Histories New York University - 2015 Conference in Florence, Italy 2016 ALA African Literature Association Annual Conference in Atlanta, USA 2017American Association for Italian Studies and the Canadian Society for Italian Studies Annual Conference at Ohio State University, USA 2017 Annual API (Association of Professional Italianist in South Africa) Conference in Johannesburg, South Africa 2018Afro/Black Paris – Future/Past- Dartmouth College.

He also teaches courses on production and digital filmmaking, on Black Diaspora in Contemporary Italy and Europe. He has taught for University of Toronto, University of Minnesota, James Madison University, Middlebury College and Colorado College. At Colorado College, Fred Kuwornu and professor Amanda Minervini taught the first course entirely dedicated to Black Italian Cinema and Digital Performance.  He founded and managed Teaching Black Italy a collective of scholars, artists, activists who are devoted to refresh the Academy's curricula about the history of Black Italy.

Filmography

See also
 Films about immigration to Italy

References

External links
 
 Counter-memory and representations of otherness: Three documentaries by Fred Kudjo Kuwornu

Italian film directors
Film people from Rome
Living people
1971 births
Italian emigrants to the United States
Film people from Bologna
Members of Sōka Gakkai
University of Bologna alumni
Filmmakers from New York (state)
Ghanaian film directors
Italian film producers
Ghanaian film producers